The 40th Annual Annie Awards honoring the best in animation of 2012 were held on February 2, 2013 at Royce Hall in Los Angeles, California.

Production nominees
Nominations announced on December 3, 2012

References

External links
 Complete list of 40th Annual Annie Awards nominees and winners

2012
2012 film awards
Annie
Annie